One Happy Family is an American sitcom television series where newlyweds Dick and Penny Cooper live with both her parents ("The Hogans") and grandparents ("The Hacketts") all in the same house together that aired from January 13 until June 23, 1961.

Premise
Unable to afford a place of their own, a meteorologist (Dick Cooper) and his wife (Penny Cooper) decided to move in with her parents (Barney and Mildred Hogan) and grandparents (Charley and Lovey Hackett) in the same house together.

Cast

Dick Sargent as Dick Cooper  
Jody Warner as Penny Cooper  
Chick Chandler as Barney Hogan  
Elisabeth Fraser as Mildred Hogan  
Jack Kirkwood as Charley Hackett  
Cheerio Meredith as Lovey Hackett  
Willard Waterman as Mr. Douglas (2 episodes)
Maurice Gosfield as Fred (1 episode)
James Komack as Perkins (1 episode)
George Tobias as Mr. Kendall (1 episode)

Episodes

Reruns
The show has aired on Decades in the past.

References

External links
 
TV Guide

1961 American television series debuts
1961 American television series endings
1960s American sitcoms
English-language television shows
NBC original programming
Television series by Mark Goodson-Bill Todman Productions